Peter Magnus Flanigan (June 21, 1923 in New York City, New York – July 29, 2013) was an American investment banker who later became an influential aide and fundraiser for President Richard M. Nixon.

Life
Born to wealthy parents, Horace "Hap" Flanigan, a banker, and Aimee (née Magnus) Flanigan, a granddaughter of Adolphus Busch, co-founder of Anheuser-Busch, in Manhattan, Peter Flanigan was raised Catholic. He served as a U.S. Navy carrier pilot during World War II. He graduated summa cum laude from Princeton University and joined the investment firm of Dillon, Read & Company.

Politics
Flanigan, a committed Republican, who had supported Nixon over John F. Kennedy in the  1960 U.S. presidential election, was named Nixon's deputy campaign manager in 1968. He served as a presidential assistant until 1972. Such was Flanigan's influence and support for big business that Ralph Nader labeled him as the "mini-president". He resigned from the Nixon administration in June 1974.

Diplomacy
Flanigan was nominated as Ambassador Extraordinary and Plenipotentiary (to Spain) by Nixon's successor, President Gerald Ford, however the nomination, which was made on September 17, 1974, was stalled in the Senate and he never received his commission.

Family
Flanigan's first wife, Brigid (née Snow), died in 2006. The couple had five children, one of whom, Sister Louise Marie Flanigan, is a Roman Catholic nun. Flanigan, a widower, married an Austrian national, Dorothea von Oswald, in 2008. The couple had homes in Wildenhag, Oberösterreich, Austria, and in Purchase, New York.

Death
Flanigan died, aged 90, at a hospital in a small town outside Salzburg, Austria, from undisclosed causes.

References

External links
 

1923 births
2013 deaths
United States Navy pilots of World War II
American bankers
Nixon administration personnel
People from Manhattan
Princeton University alumni
Businesspeople from New York City
People from Purchase, New York
Catholics from New York (state)
Military personnel from New York City
John M. Olin Foundation